Frank Grosshans is an American mathematician who works in invariant theory, where he is known for the discovery of Grosshans subgroups and Grosshans graded coefficients.  He is a professor of mathematics at West Chester University, Pennsylvania. Grosshans has been an invited speaker at meetings of the Mathematical Association of America.

He received his B.S. from the University of Illinois and his Ph.D. in mathematics from the University of Chicago. He taught at University of Pennsylvania and Johns Hopkins University before joining the West Chester University.

Selected books and publications
 
 
 
 
 
 
Gleeson, R., Grosshans, F. D., Hirsch, M. J., Williams, R. M. (2003) "Algorithms for the Recognition of 2D Images of m Points and n Lines in 3D". Image and Vision Computing. 21(6): 497–504. https://doi.org/10.1016/S0262-8856(03)00029-5

References

External links
Frank Grosshans. West Chester University of Pennsylvania. Accessed 30 March 2009.

Living people
20th-century American mathematicians
21st-century American mathematicians
University of Chicago alumni
University of Illinois alumni
West Chester University faculty
Year of birth missing (living people)